artegg-yumi is a Japanese singer-songwriter, film director and producer. A member of the Director's guild of Japan.

Career
She is the creator, director and producer of the film "Kohtaro in Space Wonderland" and was awarded the Young Creative Awards at the Cinema New York City in 2017, where Bo Svenson and others participated as judges. The same year, the film was distributed to libraries all across Japan and held a serial publication in the Kids Station corporate DVD. The film was screened at the box office for one week at the Cinema Novecento in Yokohama city of Kanagawa prefecture.
The film "One last time" produced in 2018 received high reviews from movie critics Pieter-Jan Van Haecke and Panos Kotzathanasis.
Provided music and theme song to the films Eraser Wars and "MIDNIGHT" directed by the director AKIRA.
When starring on the program "Super Idol" aired on Taiwan Television Enterprise, critiqued by the composer Wang Chi-ping as having "incredible melody, creativity and performance" and by Huang Kuo-lun as having the "uniqueness and talent like an anime character".
The song "Distant sky (Harukana Sora)" in which she participated in as the vocal and lyricist was published in the music magazine, Monthly Player No. 577 as an outstanding work.

Discography

Singles
As lead artist

Albums

Movie

Feature film
 Kohtaro in Space Wonderland（2017）
 CINEMA NEW York Festival - cinema New York City official selection Young Creative Awards
 Toronto international independent film festival
 Aichi International Women's Film Festival

Art activity
 Group exhibition
 Tokyo Metropolitan Art Museum (2014) - Belladonna Art Exhibition-3D Works Exhibition (Belladonna Art Selected)
 Navigating the Japanese Future 2014 (2014)- Exhibition at HIVE Gallery in Los Angeles. Selected as an official poster.
 Tokyo Metropolitan Art Museum (2015) - Belladonna Art Exhibition-Selected Exhibition

 Published
 Contemporary Art Artist File IV (2015)
 COOL JAPAN creators file IV (Publishing, ARTBOX International) (2015)
 Cool Japan creators file V (2017)

References

External links
 artegg-yumi Official website
 "Kohtaro in Space Wonderland"
 Youtube Official channel

Living people
Japanese women singer-songwriters
Japanese singer-songwriters
Japanese women artists
Japanese women film directors
Japanese film producers
Japanese women film producers
Year of birth missing (living people)